The communauté de communes les Terres d’Yèvre  was located in the Cher  département  of the Centre-Val de Loire region of France. It was created in January 2003. It was merged into the new Communauté de communes Cœur de Berry in January 2017.

Member communes 
It comprised the following 3 communes:

Allouis
Foëcy
Mehun-sur-Yèvre

References 

Terres d'Yevre